Bambaloo is a children's television program formerly shown on the Seven Network between 2003 and 2007. More recently it has been shown on the ABC and is suitable for 3- to 5-year-olds. The show focuses on song repetition to help children anticipate the next activity. The show was created by famous Australian animator Yoram Gross and The Jim Henson Company for a total of 105 episodes.

Characters 
 Fidget the dog
 Jet the fish
 Portia the bird
 Jinx and Gypsy the mice
 Sam the human
 Jake the human
 There are also around 100 guests who get called  to tell a story (and teach a lesson) to the Bambaloo tree friends by Jinx and Gypsy.

Credited cast 
 Angela Kelly (Sam the human and host)
 Andre Eikmeier (Jake the other human)
 Emma de Vries (puppeteer and voice of Portia)
 Adam Kronenberg (puppeteer and voice of Fidget)
 David Collins (puppeteer and voice of Jinx and Jet)
 Roslyn Oades (puppeteer and voice of Gypsy)

Production 
Animated by Buster Dandy Productions which also did Five Minutes More and Blue Water High (even though the show was made by Southern Star). Bambaloo is a Yoram Gross/Jim Henson Television production. Produced in association with Seven Network

Episodes
 Monkey Nuts
 Puppy Love
 Fame Game
 Rhinestone Cowbird
 Hot Treat Cold Treat
 Bird In A Flap
 A Whiffy Sniff
 Little Fish, Big Noise
 Biscuit Bandits
 A Nutty Treat
 Forest Friend
 Fly Me To The Moon
 King Jet
 Best Crest
 Pet For A Knight
 Fast Or Last
 Bottle Full Of Sun
 Jungle Japes
 Seeing Is Believing
 It's Laughter We're After
 The Prezzie Pixie
 The Twinkling Bush
 Grow Your Own
 Star Fish
 Dagnabbit!: That Dog's A Rabbit
 Go Slow
 Fly By
 From Here To Reindeer
 Fidget's Smoky Mountain
 Game For A Laugh
 Woodland Warble
 Bat Nap
 Super Jet
 Belle Of The Bug Ball
 The Sheep Show
 Night Flight Fright
 The Hottest Spot

Songs
 Coming Home
 Animal Boogie
 I Can Fly
 A To B
 It's Hot Hot Hot
 Tell Me
 Look Around
 Funny Sounds
 Time For A Change
 Creepy Crawlies
 Everything Around Us
 The World Is Turning

References

External links
 Bambaloo at IMDb

2003 Australian television series debuts
2004 Australian television series endings
Australian children's television series
Australian preschool education television series
Australian television shows featuring puppetry
Australian Broadcasting Corporation original programming
2000s preschool education television series
Seven Network original programming
Television series by The Jim Henson Company
Australian television series with live action and animation